Eyewitness is a British nature and science television series produced by the BBC and DK Vision.  The series is based on the bestselling series of Eyewitness Books by Dorling Kindersley, which still continues to this day. Guy Michelmore composed the series' opening and ending themes, as well as the score for each individual episode of Season 1, with Guy Dagul writing the score for each individual episode of Seasons 2 and 3, respectively. Dagul's scores for season 3 also incorporated stock music tracks and cues by Dick DeBenedictis.

Format
Eyewitness, like most other shows of its kind, is a documentary series. Each half-hour episode focuses on a single subject in the field of natural science,  such as the Solar System or the various functions of the human body, similar in form to the book series on which it was based, with most being based, in part or in whole, off of existing book titles at the time, with few exceptions (though some titles, such as Planets and Natural Disaster, the series finale, started off as episodes and were made into books years later). Combining fact with fiction, the series takes place in the fictional "Eyewitness Museum", a CGI science museum made to replicate, enhance, and expand upon the much-imitated white and empty signature visual style of the books that made them so successful in the first place. Various galleries within the museum are always featured and change constantly with each season and episode and stock footage, which is usually seen through large windows or other depressions in the walls of the museum is also shown regularly. The original book series has ben renowned for its striking visual style involving objects specially photographed against a plain white background, and the accompanying TV series brings this to life through video and audio. In addition, almost every episode features a "Hero". The Hero is an animal, character, or object which drives the action of the episode and is continually referred back to throughout. These include the rooster-shaped weathervane from Weather, Legs the claymation Tyrannosaurus from Dinosaur, the shape-shifting paper boat from Pond and River, the hyena from Monster, the salmon from Fish, the crab from Seashore, the cockroach from Prehistoric Life, the robotic human mime artist from Human Machine, Smedley the living human skeleton from Skeleton, Connell from Dog, and the husky and king penguin from Arctic and Antarctic.

The original British version of the series was narrated by the late Andrew Sachs for its entire run, while the US version was narrated by Martin Sheen for the first two seasons. However, Sachs took over narrating both versions (with separate accents provided for each country) for the third and final season. The series producer was Bill Butt for the first season, Briget Sneyd and sometimes Richard Thomson whenever Sneyd had to serve as editor for the second season, and Martin Mortimore for the third season.

In the US, the series aired in primetime on PBS nationwide. When the series was released onto VHS following the original run of each season, the US version of episodes from the first two seasons featured brief behind-the-scenes "making of" clips, each lasting five minutes after the main program, with the UK version having this feature for episodes of the third and final season. In 2003, eight episodes of the series were released onto interactive DVDs that featured interactive links to brief clips from other episodes of the series during the main program. The UK narration was kept in the American releases of these interactive DVDs, which were distributed by the Library Video Company through its Schlessinger Media division. A few years later, continuing well into the early 2010’s, a larger number of episodes were released onto DVD in the US. The US narration was included on these releases, as well as the first special as a bonus feature.

There are also four Eyewitness Virtual Reality software titles based on the series: "Cat", "Bird", "Dinosaur Hunter", and "Earth Quest". One of these, "Shark", although seen on the elevator console, was never made.

Eyewitness has also been dubbed into other languages for broadcast internationally, including Spanish, Italian, French, German, Russian, Indonesian, and Finnish, among others.

Episodes

Season 1 (1994)

Season 2 (1996)

Season 3 (1997)

Specials
 The Making of Eyewitness - November 7, 1994 (US only)
 The Making of Eyewitness 2 - December 16, 1996 (US only)
 The Making of Eyewitness 3 - December 15, 1997 (UK only)

Reception
It has won several awards, including at least two Emmys:
 1994 Parent's Choice Award (for Jungle)
 1996 NEA Award
 1996 1997 and 1998 Golden Gate Awards
 Chicago International Children's Film Festival Excellence in Children's Media

References

External links
 
 
 Eyewitness DVD from Schlessinger Media, a division of Library Video Company (US version)

British non-fiction television series
Nature educational television series
Science education television series
Astronomy education television series
Emmy Award-winning programs
1990s British documentary television series
1994 British television series debuts
1997 British television series endings
1990s American documentary television series
1994 American television series debuts
1997 American television series endings
BBC television documentaries
PBS original programming
English-language television shows